Lovens  may refer to:
 Loven, Switzerland, a former municipality now part of La Brillaz in the canton of Fribourg
 Lovens Gjed (born 1995), a Haitian-American entrepreneur
 Paul Lovens  (born 1949), a German jazz musician

See also
 Loven (disambiguation)